Håvard Fjær Grip is a Norwegian cybernetics engineer, adjunct assistant professor and robotics technologist. He leads the Flight Control Team and is Chief Pilot for NASA's Jet Propulsion Laboratory Mars helicopter, Ingenuity. Grip successfully flew Ingenuity's first flight on Mars on April 19, 2021, making history as the first extraterrestrial helicopter flight.

Life 
From 2001 to 2006 Grip took a five-year engineering cybernetics master's degree, and from 2006 to 2010 a PhD at the Norwegian University of Science and Technology (NTNU). During his studies he was awarded for outstanding academic performance in engineering studies, as well as having the best master's thesis in 2006 in Norway within the field of control and automation.

After having been awarded and having achieved his five-year master's degree with almost only A's, Grip handed in his master's thesis Nonlinear vehicle velocity observer with road-tire friction adaptation. The dissertation focused on real-time estimation of dynamic variables for use in safety systems in cars, such as anti-lock brakes (ABS brakes) and electronic stability program (ESP). Out from the thesis the car giant Daimler AG showed great interest in Grip's work. As a result, he was hired on a contract project at the Daimler Group Research & Advanced Engineering while employed as a Scientific Researcher at SINTEF ICT from 2007 - 2008. Here he continued researching anticollision systems for safer cars in the automotive industry.

In 2010, Grip started working as an adjunct assistant professor for the School of Electrical Engineering and Computer Science at the Washington State University. Here he conducts an independent research project from a personal research grant by the Research Council of Norway while employed as a Senior Research Fellow for the council. His research interests topics is nonlinear control and observer design, navigation and vehicle state estimation, decentralized control of heterogeneous systems, and structurally based design techniques for stability and robustness of nonlinear systems.

Grip has since 2013 worked as a robotics technologist in the Guidance and Control Analysis Group at Jet Propulsion Laboratory for NASA at the California Institute of Technology (Caltech). He is currently leading the Mars Helicopter Guidance, Navigation, and Control team, where he designs algorithms and software that helps control and guide vehicles such as spacecraft and the Martian helicopter. Grip's role as Chief Pilot includes planning the flight, constructing command sequences and analyzing the flight data for the helicopter. Other team members taking part in the helicopter project includes Program Executive Dave Lavery, Chief Engineer Bob Balaram, and Project Manager MiMi Aung.

The Martian helicopter was launched from Earth with the rover Perseverance through NASA's Mars 2020 mission as a part of NASA's Mars Exploration Program. The rover carried the Martian helicopter along with seven other instruments to Mars, where the rover's mission is to identify Martian environments that is capable of supporting life. One of the instruments includes the Radar Imager for Mars' subsurface experiment (RIMFAX), which is a Norwegian developed georadar by Norwegian Defence Research Establishment (FFI), led by Principal Investigator Svein-Erik Hamran of FFI, and his team that includes scientists from Norway, Canada and the United States.

On April 19, 2021, at 11:30 UTC Håvard Fjær Grip flew Ingenuity for 39.1 seconds. Rising the helicopter vertically about ten feet, rotating in place 96 degrees in a planned maneuver, and landing successfully.

Personal life 
As hobbies, Grip likes to fly his Piper Cherokee 140 as a private aircraft pilot, bicycle, play the piano and hang out with his family.

Selected publications 
 H. F. Grip, A. Saberi, and T. A. Johansen, "Observers for interconnected nonlinear and linear systems," Automatica, vol. 48, no. 7, pp. 1339–1346, 2012.

 H. F. Grip, T. Yang, A. Saberi, and A. A. Stoorvogel, "Output synchronization for heterogeneous networks of non-introspective agents," Automatica, vol. 48, no. 10, pp. 2444–2453, 2012.

 H. F. Grip, L. Imsland, T. A. Johansen, J. C. Kalkkuhl, and A. Suissa, "Vehicle sideslip estimation: Design, implementation, and experimental validation," IEEE Control Systems Magazine, vol. 29, no. 5, pp. 36–52, 2009.

References

External links 
Håvard Fjær Grip publications indexed by Google Scholar.
Håvard Fjær Grip publications indexed by NASA.

Year of birth missing (living people)
Living people
Norwegian University of Science and Technology alumni
Washington State University faculty
Norwegian engineers
California Institute of Technology people
Jet Propulsion Laboratory faculty
NASA people
21st-century Norwegian engineers